Dubrovka may refer to:
Dubrovka (inhabited locality), name of several inhabited localities in Russia
 Dubrovka (Lyublinsko-Dmitrovskaya Line), a station of Moscow Metro, Moscow, Russia
 Dubrovka (Moscow Central Circle), a station of Moscow Metro
Dubrovka Theater, where the Moscow theater hostage crisis took place on October 23, 2002